is a city located in Kyoto Prefecture, Japan. , the city had an estimated population of 30,744 in 14406 households and a population density of 50 persons per km².

Geography 
Nantan is located in the southern part of the Tamba region in central Kyoto Prefecture.

Neighbouring municipalities 
Kyoto Prefecture
 Kyoto
 Ayabe
 Kameoka
  Kyōtamba
Fukui Prefecture
 Ōi
Shiga Prefecture
 Takashima
Osaka Prefecture
 Nose
Hyōgo Prefecture
 Tamba-Sasayama

Climate
Nantan has a Humid climate (Köppen Cfa) characterized by warm, wet summers and cold winters with heavy snowfall.

Demographics
Per Japanese census data, the population of Nantan has declined slightly in recent decades.

History
The area of the modern town of Nantan was within ancient Tanba Province, and may have been the site of the provincial capital in the Nara period. During the Edo Period, Sonobe Domain was located within its borders. The town of Sonobe was established with the creation of the modern municipalities system on April 1, 1889. Sonobe merged with the neighboring towns of Hiyoshi,  and Yagi (all from Funai District), and the town of Miyama (from Kitakuwada District) to form the city of Nantan on January 1, 2006.

Government
Nantan has a mayor-council form of government with a directly elected mayor and a unicameral town council of 22 members. Nantan, together with the town of Kyōtamba contributes one member to the Kyoto Prefectural Assembly. In terms of national politics, the city is part of Kyoto 4th district of the lower house of the Diet of Japan.

Economy
Nantan has an economy based on regional commerce, agriculture and forestry. The main products include mizuna and other "Kyoto vegetables".

Education

Colleges and universities
Bukkyo University, Sonobe campus
College of Medical Technology Meiji University of Oriental Medicine
Kyoto College of Medical Technology
Kyoto University of Arts and Crafts
Meiji University of Integrative Medicine

Primary and secondary schools
Nantan has seven public elementary schools and five public middle schools operated by the city government and three public high schools operated by the Kyoto Prefectural Department of Education. There is also one private middle school and one private high school. The prefecture also operates one special education school for the handicapped.

Transportation

Railway 
 JR West – San'in Main Line / [[Sagano Line)
  -   -  -  -  -  -

Highway
 Kyoto Jūkan Expressway

Sister city relations
  Manila, Philippines
  Clutha District, New Zealand

Localattractions

Sights include the Rurikei Prefectural Natural Park and Miyama Kayabuki no sato "Thatched farmhouses village".

Noted people from Nantan
Shigeru Miyamoto – video game designer and creator of Mario and The Legend of Zelda
Bonnie Pink – singer-songwriter
Makoto Fujita – actor
Hiromu Nonaka – politician
Yoshimi Tanaka – politician
Yasuhiro Nakagawa – politician

References

External links

Nantan City official website  (some English)

Populated places established in 2006
Cities in Kyoto Prefecture
Nantan, Kyoto